Marty Small Sr. (born March 25, 1974) is an American politician who is the current mayor of Atlantic City, New Jersey. He was elected 8-0 by a vote of the Atlantic City city council after the previous mayor Frank Gilliam resigned upon pleading guilty to wire fraud.

Career 
Small was first elected to the Atlantic City city council as 2nd Ward councilman in 2003.

In 2006 he was charged and acquitted of election fraud, and in 2011 he was again charged and acquitted of election fraud concerning the 2009 Atlantic City mayoral election along with five other Democrats.

In 2017, Small narrowly lost to Frank Gilliam in the Democratic primary for Atlantic City mayor.

Following the resignation of previous Atlantic City mayor Frank Gilliam, the city council voted to appoint Small as mayor. He served for an unexpired term through December 31, 2020 pending a special election in November 2020. In November 2020, he was re-elected for an additional one-year term and in November 2021, he won his first four-year term as mayor.

Personal life 
Small attended Atlantic City High School, where he played basketball.

Small graduated from Stockton University in New Jersey, where he earned a Bachelor of Arts in Communications.

He is married to La’Quetta Small, who is the principal of Atlantic City High School, and together they have two children.

References

External links 
 Atlantic City mayor's website

1974 births
Living people
Mayors of Atlantic City, New Jersey
New Jersey Democrats
African-American mayors in New Jersey
Atlantic City High School alumni
Stockton University alumni
21st-century African-American people
20th-century African-American people